Flosculariaceae is an order of rotifers, found in fresh and brackish water.

Families
The order includes the six following families.
Conochilidae
Flosculariidae
Hexarthridae
Testudinellidae
Trochosphaeridae
Filiniidae

References

 
Monogononta
Protostome orders